The following are Pennsylvania State football champions that play in the PIAA. This list is organized by class, the Pennsylvania Interscholastic Athletic Association has football teams who are members of the PIAA in classes such as Single A (A), Double A (AA), Triple A (AAA), Quad A (AAAA), Five A (AAAAA) and Six A (AAAAAA) which is based on the schools pupil enrollment. Smaller schools are typically single A or Double A where larger schools are five A or six A schools.

Class AAAAAA
The following is a list of class AAAAAA or 6A football state champions part of the PIAA. Class 6A was just formed and its inaugural season was the 2016 football season.

Class AAAAA
The following is a list of class AAAAA or 5A football state champions part of PIAA. Class 5A was just formed and its inaugural season was the 2016 football season.

Class AAAA
The following are the Pennsylvania Interscholastic Athletic Association football champions of Class quad A since the 1988 season.

Yearly winners

References

American football in Pennsylvania
Pennsylvania Interscholastic Athletic Association
High school football in the United States